Victoria is a commune in Iași County, Western Moldavia, Romania, part of the Iași metropolitan area. It is composed of seven villages: Frăsuleni, Icușeni, Luceni, Sculeni, Stânca, Șendreni and Victoria.

Sculeni is a border checkpoint to Moldova.

References

Communes in Iași County
Localities in Western Moldavia
Moldova–Romania border crossings
Populated places on the Prut